Saloniana was an Illyrian settlement of the Delmatae.

The possible location is modern-day Imotski.

See also 
List of ancient cities in Illyria

References

External links
Illyria and Illyrians

Former populated places in the Balkans
Cities in ancient Illyria
Illyrian Croatia